Fantômas se déchaîne is a 1965 film starring Jean Marais as the arch villain Fantômas opposite Louis de Funès as the earnest but outclassed commissaire Juve and the journalist Fandor, also played by Marais. It was France's answer, with the Fantômas trilogy starting in 1964, to the James Bond phenomenon that swept the world at around the same time. It is the second in the trilogy of Fantômas films, that became extremely successful in Europe and Soviet Union and found success even in the United States and Japan. In this film Jean Marais also plays professor Lefebvre.

Plot 
In the second film of the trilogy Fantômas kidnaps distinguished scientist professor Marchand with the aim to develop a super weapon that will enable him to menace the world. Fantômas is also planning to abduct a second scientist, professor Lefebvre. Journalist Fandor develops an ingenious scheme whereby he disguises himself as Lefebvre and attends a scientific conference in Rome, Italy to lure Fantômas into attempting to kidnap him.

The plan seems to work until commissaire Juve steps into the fray and as usual messes things up, although Juve redeems himself by saving the troupe with an array of special gadgets which he has developed especially for his hunt for Fantômas. Yet, once again Fantômas escapes in style, using his Citroën DS with retractable wings that converts into an airplane in what amounts to one of the most unexpected and spectacular scenes of the genre.

Cast

Release 
The film premiered in France on 8 December 1965.

It was the sixth most popular film of 1965 in France, after The Sucker, Goldfinger, Thunderball, Gendarme in New York and Mary Poppins and before God's Thunder and The Wise Guys. It had admissions of 4,412,446.

The Fantômas trilogy

References

External links 
 

1960s crime comedy films
1960s comedy thriller films
1965 films
French crime comedy films
Films directed by André Hunebelle
1960s French-language films
French sequel films
Films set in Rome
Fantômas films
Italian crime comedy films
1965 comedy films
1960s Italian films
1960s French films